Haywood may refer to:

Places

Canada
 Haywood, Manitoba

United Kingdom
 Haywood, Herefordshire
 Great Haywood, Staffordshire
 Little Haywood, Staffordshire

United States
 Hayward, California, formerly Haywood
 Haywood, Kentucky
 Haywood, North Carolina
 Haywood, Oklahoma
 Haywood, Virginia
 Haywood, West Virginia
 Haywood City, Missouri
 Haywood County, North Carolina
 Haywood County, Tennessee

Other uses
 Haywood (surname), including a list of people with the name
 Haywood (band), American indie rock band

See also

 Hayward (disambiguation)
 Haywoode, English singer
 Heywood (disambiguation)
 Haywood Mall, in Greenville, South Carolina, U.S.